Mount Ayr is a city in Ringgold County, Iowa, United States. The population was 1,988 at the time of the 2020 census. It is the county seat of Ringgold County. Mount Ayr is a rural community in southwestern Iowa, 22 miles west of Interstate 35 on State Highway 2. Mount Ayr was founded in 1875 and the community was named in honor of poet Robert Burns’ birthplace in Ayr, Scotland. The “mount” was added to indicate its location on the highest point of land in the area.

Geography
Mount Ayr is at the intersection of US Route 169 and Iowa Highway 2. Kellerton is approximately nine miles to the east and Diagonal is about eight miles to the northwest.

Climate

According to the Köppen Climate Classification system, Mount Ayr has a hot-summer humid continental climate, abbreviated "Dfa" on climate maps.

Demographics

2010 census
As of the census of 2010, there were 1,691 people, 746 households, and 437 families residing in the city. The racial makeup of the city was 98.1% White, 0.1% African American, 0.1% Native American, 0.7% Asian, 0.8% from other races, and 0.4% from two or more races. Hispanic or Latino of any race were 1.6% of the population.

There were 746 households, of which 24.1% had children under the age of 18 living with them, 47.9% were married couples living together, 7.4% had a female householder with no husband present, 3.4% had a male householder with no wife present, and 41.4% were non-families. 37.3% of all households were made up of individuals, and 24.8% had someone living alone who was 65 years of age or older. The average household size was 2.14 and the average family size was 2.80.

The median age in the city was 49.5 years. 19.9% of residents were under the age of 18; 6.3% were between the ages of 18 and 24; 17.5% were from 25 to 44; 26.6% were from 45 to 64; and 29.7% were 65 years of age or older. The gender makeup of the city was 44.5% male and 55.5% female.

2000 census
As of the census of 2000, there were 1,822 people, 780 households, and 492 families residing in the city. The racial makeup of the city was 98.96% White, 0.27% Native American, 0.27% Asian, 0.05% from other races, and 0.44% from two or more races. Hispanic or Latino of any race were 0.44% of the population.

There were 780 households, out of which 26.4% had children under the age of 18 living with them, 53.6% were married couples living together, 6.9% had a female householder with no husband present, and 36.9% were non-families. 34.7% of all households were made up of individuals, and 23.5% had someone living alone who was 65 years of age or older. The average household size was 2.21 and the average family size was 2.82.

Age spread: 22.1% under the age of 18, 6.8% from 18 to 24, 20.6% from 25 to 44, 19.7% from 45 to 64, and 30.8% who were 65 years of age or older. The median age was 46 years. For every 100 females, there were 80.4 males. For every 100 females age 18 and over, there were 75.2 males.

The median income for a household in the city was $26,893, and the median income for a family was $37,188. Males had a median income of $27,333 versus $20,184 for females. The per capita income for the city was $14,444. About 8.3% of families and 13.1% of the population were below the poverty line, including 16.1% of those under age 18 and 14.5% of those age 65 or over.

Arts and culture

Library
The Mount Ayr Public Library is a Carnegie Library and has a microfiche film collection dating back to 1838 and a specialized genealogy room.

Parks and recreation
Local places for recreation include:
 Judge Lewis Recreational Park, the city park
 Poe Hollow Park & Ringgold Trailway
 Sun Valley Lake and Resort, including a golf course and boating facilities
 Fife's Grove and Loch Ayr, including a park and lake

Education
Mount Ayr is the home of the Mount Ayr Community School District, which serves Mount Ayr, Beaconsfield, Benton, Delphos, Ellston, Kellerton, Maloy, Redding, Tingley, and portions of Clearfield.

Mount Ayr has one high school (grades 7-12) and one elementary school (grades K-6), as well as a preschool and alternative high school.  Enrollment averages around 50 students in each class.  The drama department of Mount Ayr Community High School (MACHS) has produced several students who have played at district and state competitions.

Education statistics
For population 25 years and over in Mount Ayr:
 High school or higher: 81.4%
 Bachelor's degree or higher: 16.6%
 Graduate or professional degree: 5.2%

Airport
Judge Lewis Field, located two miles southeast of Mount Ayr  and FAA Identified as 1Y3, is a small airport serving single-engine aircraft, operated by the city of Mount Ayr.

Notable people

Peggy Whitson (born 1960) first female NASA Chief Astronaut.
Duane Miller (born 1947) professional football player and Drake football record-holder.

Gallery

References

External links

 
School website 
City-Data Comprehensive Statistical Data and more about Mount Ayr

Cities in Iowa
Cities in Ringgold County, Iowa
County seats in Iowa
1875 establishments in Iowa
Populated places established in 1875